Aleks Chidomere (born 12 August 2002) is a Ukrainian professional footballer of Nigerian descent who plays as a centre-forward for Ukrainian club Metalist Kharkiv.

References

External links
 

2002 births
Living people
Ukrainian people of Nigerian descent
Piddubny Olympic College alumni
Footballers from Kyiv
Ukrainian footballers
Association football forwards
FC Obolon-Brovar Kyiv players
FC Obolon-2 Kyiv players
FC Metalist Kharkiv players
Ukrainian Premier League players
Ukrainian First League players
Ukrainian Second League players
Ukraine youth international footballers